Newport Ebbw Junction TMD was a traction maintenance depot located in Newport, Wales. The depot was situated on the Ebbw Valley Railway and was near Newport railway station. 

The depot code was EJ.

History 
Before its closure in 1965, Class 08 shunters and Class 25 and 53 locomotives could be seen at the depot.

References 
 

 Railway depots in Wales
Rail transport in Newport, Wales